Ophiotrichidae are a family of ophiurid brittle stars within the suborder Gnathophiurina.

All have arms with delicate translucent, thorny spines. The arms are flexible in all directions. The jaws contain clusters of well-developed tooth papillae on the apex but not on the sides.  There are no mouth papillae. Inside the mouth edge there is a second pair of tube feet. They show large radial shields. The dorsal surface of the disc is covered with spines and thorny towers.

Systematics
Ophiotrichidae contains the following genera:
Asteria (nomen dubium)
Gymnolophus Brock, 1888
Lissophiothrix H.L. Clark, 1938
Macrophiothrix H.L. Clark, 1938
Ophioaethiops Brock, 1888
Ophiocampsis Duncan, 1887
Ophiocnemis Müller & Troschel, 1842
Ophiogymna Ljungman, 1866
Ophiolophus Marktanner-Turneretscher, 1887
Ophiomaza Lyman, 1871
Ophiophthirius Döderlein, 1898
Ophiopsammium Lyman, 1874
Ophiopteron Ludwig, 1888
Ophiothela Verrill, 1867
Ophiothrichoides Delage & Hérouard, 1903
Ophiothrix Müller & Troschel, 1840
Ophiotrichoides Ludwig, 1882

References

 Hansson, H.G. (2001). Echinodermata, in: Costello, M.J. et al. (Ed.) (2001). European register of marine species: a check-list of the marine species in Europe and a bibliography of guides to their identification. Collection Patrimoines Naturels, 50: pp. 336–351 
 Stöhr, S.; Hansson, H. (2009). Ophiotrichidae. In: Stöhr, S., O’Hara, T. (Eds) (2009). World Ophiuroidea database.
 P.J. Hayward and J.S. Ryland (ed.), Handbook of the Marine Fauna of North-West Europe, Oxford University Press, Oxford, 1996, 

 
Gnathophiurina
Echinoderm families